Jaipal Singh Stadium is a multi-purpose stadium located in the city of Ranchi in Jharkhand, India. It was built in 1978 and was named after the famous hockey player and captain Jaipal Singh Munda after a request was made by Birsa Seva Dal.

After it was built, the infrastructure was neglected until 2013 when the Government of Jharkhand and Ranchi Municipal Corporation made plans to revamp it into a sports complex with aid from the central government.

In 2008, a proposal came from the urban development minister, Raghubar Das, to make the stadium's site into a shopping complex but the plan was opposed by residents and sports lovers as well as councillors. Sport lovers and residents created "Jaipal Singh Stadium Bachao Sangharsh Samiti" to save the stadium.

In a proposal in 2013, the stadium would undergo changes and have a 300 by 150 metres football ground, tennis court, badminton court, multi-gymnasium with modern equipment, two pavilions, open-air theatre, food court and shops.

See also
 Birsa Munda Athletics Stadium
 Birsa Munda Football Stadium
 Birsa Munda Hockey Stadium
 JSCA International Stadium Complex
 List of stadiums by capacity

References

External links

Football venues in Jharkhand
Athletics (track and field) venues in India
Sports venues in Jharkhand
Buildings and structures in Ranchi
Sport in Ranchi
Sports venues in Ranchi
Sports venues completed in 1978
1978 establishments in Bihar
20th-century architecture in India